Mauro Silva Sousa (born 31 October 1990), known simply as Mauro, is a Brazilian retired footballer who played as a defensive midfielder.

Club career
Mauro was born in Livramento de Nossa Senhora, Bahia. He spent his entire professional career in Portugal after starting out at Atlético Clube Goianiense, representing Primeira Liga clubs Gil Vicente F.C. and S.C. Braga.

On 3 June 2018, aged only 27, Mauro was forced to retire due a serious knee injury contracted in late November 2016 that led to a bacterial infection.

Honours
Braga
Taça de Portugal: 2015–16

References

External links

1990 births
Living people
Brazilian footballers
Association football midfielders
Atlético Clube Goianiense players
Primeira Liga players
Liga Portugal 2 players
Gil Vicente F.C. players
S.C. Braga B players
S.C. Braga players
Brazilian expatriate footballers
Expatriate footballers in Portugal
Brazilian expatriate sportspeople in Portugal